Braunstein is a German surname. Notable people with the name include:

Alexander E. Braunstein (1902–1986), Soviet biochemist
Edward Braunstein (born 1981), American politician
Guy Braunstein (born 1971), Israeli-American conductor
Ilia Braunstein (1908–1980), Belgian philatelist
Jacques Braunstein (1939–2009), Venezuelan musician
Mark Mathew Braunstein (born 1951), American writer
Natasha Lyonne (Natasha Braunstein; born 1979), American actress
Néstor Braunstein (1941–2022), Argentine-Mexican physician
Paul Braunstein (born 1970), Canadian actor
Peter Braunstein (born 1964), American rapist
Pierre Braunstein (born 1947), French chemist
Ronald Braunstein (born 1955), American orchestral conductor
Ron Braunstein (curler) (born c.1940), Canadian curler
Necro (rapper) (Ron Braunstein; born 1976), American rapper; brother of Ill Bill
Rubin Braunstein (1922–2018), American physicist
Samuel L. Braunstein (born 1961), Australian professor
Terry Braunstein (born 1939), Canadian curler
Terry Braunstein (artist) (born 1942), photomontage artist
Ill Bill (William Braunstein; born 1972), American rapper

Other uses
Toot Braunstein, character of Drawn Together
Braunstein (wargame), a game considered to be the ancestor of role-playing games
Braunstein–Ghosh–Severini entropy, quantum mechanical entropy

See also
Bronstein
Brownstein
Brownstone

German-language surnames
Jewish surnames

de:Braunstein